The band-tailed pigeon (Patagioenas fasciata) is a medium-sized bird of the Americas. Its closest relatives are the Chilean pigeon and the ring-tailed pigeon, which form a clade of Patagioenas with a terminal tail band and iridescent plumage on their necks. There are at least 8 sub-species, and some authorities split this species into the northern band-tailed pigeon (Patagioenas fasciata) and the southern band-tailed pigeon (Patagioenas albilinea).

It ranges from British Columbia, Washington, Oregon, California, and southern Arizona south in higher elevations through Mexico and Central America to northern Argentina. In autumn it migrates out of its permanent resident range into northern California, New Mexico, and parts of Utah and Colorado. It feeds on seeds, notably acorns, as well as berries and small fruits.

Description

The coastal subspecies P. f. monilis (averaging ) is larger than the inland subspecies (averaging ).

The plumage is gray, somewhat darker above. The head and underparts have a faint pink cast, especially in the adult male; the belly is nearly white. The distal half of the tail is also pale (except in the subspecies of Baja California), whence the English name. The bill and feet are yellow, with good identification marks at sufficiently close range. Adults have green iridescence on the back of the neck, adjacent to a thin white collar on the nape. Juvenile birds have white feather edges above, giving a scaly appearance.

Behavior and ecology

This species is relatively quiet for a pigeon. Its voice is low-pitched and owl-like, often in two-syllable calls that rise and then fall (huu-ooh) with even spacing between calls. It also makes a variety of harsh squawking sounds for a variety of reasons.

It builds a rudimentary platform nest out of twigs, in which it lays one or two eggs. Outside the breeding season, it forms flocks, sometimes over 50 birds, and often becomes nomadic, following the acorn crop or moving to lower altitudes or other areas outside its breeding range.  They commonly congregate at and drink from mineral springs, although it is not fully understood why.  In addition to acorns and other seeds, the band-tailed pigeon will seasonally consume fruits such as Pacific madrona and Toyon berries. This species often visits bird feeders. With the introduction of English Holly and English Ivy, two popular plants in landscaping in western North America, the bird is found in persistent numbers in suburban areas now as well.

The parasitic louse Columbicola extinctus, believed to have become extinct with the extinction of the passenger pigeon, was recently rediscovered on the band-tailed pigeon. The band-tailed pigeon is the closest genetic relative of the passenger pigeon and has been investigated for being used in efforts to bring back that extinct species.

References

External links

 
 
 
 
 

band-tailed pigeon
Native birds of Western Canada
 Native birds of the Western United States
Birds of Mexico
 Birds of the Sierra Madre Occidental
Birds of the Sierra Madre Oriental
Birds of the Sierra Madre del Sur
Birds of the Trans-Mexican Volcanic Belt
 Birds of Central America
 Birds of the Northern Andes
 Birds of Trinidad and Tobago
 Birds of Venezuela
band-tailed pigeon